Penthouse is a men's magazine founded by Bob Guccione and published by Los Angeles-based Penthouse World Media, LLC. It combines urban lifestyle articles and softcore pornographic pictures of women that, in the 1990s, evolved into hardcore pornographic pictures of women.

Although Guccione was American, the magazine was founded in 1965 in the United Kingdom. Beginning in September 1969, it was sold in the United States as well. Since 2016, Penthouse has been owned by Penthouse World Media (formerly Penthouse Global Media Inc.), which filed for bankruptcy in 2018, with its assets acquired by WGCZ Ltd. (the owners of XVideos) in June of that year after winning a bankruptcy auction bid. Penthouse Global Media was later spun off from WGCZ and renamed Penthouse World Media.

The magazine's centerfold models are known as Penthouse Pets, and customarily wear a distinctive necklace in the form of a stylized key which incorporates both the Mars and Venus symbols in its design.

Bob Guccione
At the height of its success, Guccione, who died in 2010, was considered one of the richest men in the United States. In 1982 he was listed in the Forbes 400 ranking of wealthiest people. An April 2002 New York Times article reported Guccione as saying that Penthouse grossed $3.5 billion to $4 billion over the 30-year life of the company.

Publication history

Penthouse magazine began publication in 1965, in the UK and in North America in 1969, an attempt to compete with Hugh Hefner's Playboy. Guccione offered editorial content that was more sensational than that of Playboy, and the magazine's writing was far more investigative than Hefner's upscale emphasis, with stories about government cover-ups and scandals.

Writers such as Seymour Hersh, Craig S. Karpel, James Dale Davidson, and Ernest Volkman exposed numerous scandals and corruption at the highest levels of the United States Government. Contributors to the magazine included such writers as Isaac Asimov, James Baldwin, Howard Blum, Victor Bockris, T. C. Boyle, Alexander Cockburn, Harry Crews, Cameron Crowe, Don DeLillo, Alan Dershowitz, Edward Jay Epstein, Joe Flaherty, Chet Flippo, Albert Goldman, Anthony Haden-Guest, John Hawkes, Nat Hentoff, Warren Hinckle, Abbie Hoffman, Nicholas von Hoffman, Michael Korda, Paul Krassner, Michael Ledeen, Anthony Lewis, Peter Manso, Joyce Carol Oates, James Purdy, Philip Roth, Harrison E. Salisbury, Gail Sheehy, Robert Sherrill, Mickey Spillane, Ben Stein, Harry Stein, Tad Szulc, Jerry Tallmer, Studs Terkel, Nick Tosches, Gore Vidal, Irving Wallace, and Ruth Westheimer (Dr. Ruth).

The magazine was founded on humble beginnings. Due to Guccione's lack of resources, he personally photographed most of the models for the magazine's early issues. Without professional training, Guccione applied his knowledge of painting to his photography, establishing the diffused, soft focus look that would become one of the trademarks of the magazine's pictorials. Guccione would sometimes take several days to complete a shoot.

However, in contrast to Hugh Hefner, who threw wild parties at his Playboy Mansions, life at Guccione's mansion was remarkably sedate, even during the hedonistic 1970s. He reportedly once had his bodyguards eject a local radio personality who had been hired as a DJ and jumped into the swimming pool naked.

The magazine's pictorials offered more sexually explicit content than was commonly seen in most openly sold men's magazines of the era; it was the first to show female pubic hair, followed by full-frontal nudity and then the exposed vulva and anus. Penthouse has also, over the years, featured a number of authorized and unauthorized photos of celebrities such as Madonna and Vanessa Williams. In both cases, the photos were taken earlier in their careers and sold to Penthouse only after Madonna and Williams became famous. In the late 1990s, as poor business decisions were made and publishing control was gradually slipping away from Guccione, in a desperate attempt to boost sales,the magazine began to show more "fetish" content such as urination, bondage and "facials". Thus began the downward spiral of the magazine. Gone was the artistic and unique, soft focus lens erotic photography and the investigative journalism that brought the magazine to success and respect. Prominent companies no longer wanted their products featured in Penthouse and quickly had their advertising removed.

On January 15, 2016, a press release emanating from then-owner FriendFinder Networks announced that Penthouse would shutter its print operations and move to all digital. However, managing director Kelly Holland quickly disavowed the decision and pledged to keep the print version of the magazine alive.

Financial history
In 1982, Guccione was listed in the Forbes 400 ranking of wealthiest people, with a reported $400 million net worth. An April 2002 New York Times article quoted Guccione as saying that Penthouse grossed $3.5 billion to $4 billion over the 30-year life of the company, with a net income of almost $500 million.

In an effort to raise cash and to reduce debt, Penthouse sold its portfolio of several automotive magazine titles in 1999, for $33 million cash to Peterson Automotive, the national automotive-publishing group. While these titles were successful, it is widely reported that the science and health magazines Omni and Longevity cost Penthouse almost $100 million, contributing to its eventual financial troubles.

Bankruptcy
On August 12, 2003, General Media, the parent company of the magazine, filed for Chapter 11 bankruptcy protection. Immediately upon filing, Cerberus Capital Management entered into a $5 million debtor-in-possession credit line with General Media to provide General Media working capital. In October 2003, it was announced that Penthouse magazine was being put up for sale as part of a deal with its creditors. On November 13, 2004, Guccione resigned as chairman and CEO of Penthouse International, the parent of General Media.

Penthouse filed for bankruptcy protection on September 17, 2013. The magazine's owner FriendFinder's current common stock was wiped out and was no longer traded on the open market. In August 2013, FriendFinder's stock was delisted from Nasdaq because it consistently failed to trade for more than $1.

As of 2015, General Media Communications, Inc. publishes entertainment magazines and operates as a subsidiary of FriendFinder Networks Inc.

Ownership change
In February 2016, Penthouse Global Media – a new company headed by Penthouse Entertainment managing director Kelly Holland – acquired the Penthouse brand from FriendFinder Networks.

Penthouse Global Media filed for Chapter 11 bankruptcy on January 11, 2018 to address debt-related issues.

Penthouse Global Media, Inc. were acquired by WGCZ Ltd., operators of XVideos, on June 4, 2018 after winning a bankruptcy auction for US$11.2 million; other companies, such as MindGeek, also participated in the auction. Penthouse Global Media, Inc. was later spun off from WGCZ and renamed Penthouse World Media.

Awards and recognition 
The magazine's editorial content was praised and recognized by those in the academic field. In 1975, for example, Guccione was honored by Brandeis University for focusing "his editorial attention on such critical issues of our day as the welfare of the Vietnam veteran and problems of criminality in modern society".

In 2013, director Barry Avrich made a film about Guccione's life entitled Filthy Gorgeous: The Bob Guccione Story. It was produced by Jeremy Frommer and Rick Schwartz, who have since created a premier website inspired by Bob Guccione as an extension of the film called Filthy Gorgeous Media.

Publishing milestones

Traci Lords and Vanessa Williams
The September 1984 issue of Penthouse magazine would eventually become controversial because of its centerfold, Traci Lords. Lords posed nude for this issue at the beginning of her career as an adult film star. It was later revealed that Lords was underage throughout most of her career in pornography and was only 15 when she posed for Penthouse.

The same issue also caused controversy with nude pictures of Vanessa Williams that caused her to be stripped of her Miss America crown.

Move from softcore to hardcore pictorials and back
In 1998, Penthouse decided to change its format and began featuring sexually explicit pictures (i.e., actual oral, vaginal, and anal penetration), beginning with photos from the famed Stolen Honeymoon sex tape featuring Pamela Anderson and Tommy Lee. It also began to regularly feature pictorials of female models urinating, which, until then, had been considered a defining limit of illegal obscenity as distinguished from legal pornography.

A different approach to restoring sales was attempted by the UK version of the magazine in 1997. Under the editorship of Tom Hilditch, the magazine was rebranded as PH.UK and relaunched as middle-shelf "adult magazine for grown-ups". Fashion photographers (such as Corinne Day of The Face magazine) were hired to produce images that merged sex and fashion. The magazine's editorial content included celebrity interviews and tackled issues of sexual politics. The experiment attracted a great deal of press interest, but failed to generate a significant increase in sales. PH.UK closed in late 1998.

The new owners significantly softened the content of the magazine starting with the January 2005 issue. Penthouse no longer showed male genitalia, real or simulated male-female sex, or any form of explicit hardcore content (it does still feature female-female simulated sex on occasion, however).  While this change allowed the return of a limited number of mainstream advertisers to the magazine, it has not significantly raised the number of subscribers; total circulation is still below 350,000.

Some of Penthouses secondary publications, such as Girls of Penthouse, continue to feature occasional images of explicit sex, either classic sets from the 1990s issues or stills of adult video shoots staged by the company's Digital Media division.

Other ventures

Film
In 1976, Guccione used about US $17.5 million of his personal fortune to finance the controversial historical epic pornographic film Caligula, with Malcolm McDowell in the title role and a supporting cast including Helen Mirren, John Gielgud, Teresa Ann Savoy, and Peter O'Toole. The film, which was eventually released in late 1979, was produced in Italy (made at the Dear Studios in Rome) and was directed by Tinto Brass. In 2001, Penthouse Presents began running on Hot Choice.

Other publications
Guccione also created the magazines  Omni, Viva, and Longevity. Later Guccione started Penthouse Forum, which predominantly featured erotic writing and stories. In 1993, Penthouse published an adult comic book spin-off entitled Penthouse Comix, featuring sexually explicit stories. After an initial success, Penthouse Comix expanded into a line of four illustrated magazines with the addition of Penthouse Max, Penthouse Men's Adventure Comix and Omni Comix.

Penthouse Variations is a monthly magazine containing ostensibly reader-generated erotic stories (primarily) and some pictures and reviews. It is a spin-off magazine from Penthouse Letters.  It was initially published in 1978. Variations focuses on "kinkier" topics of sexuality, such as bondage, fetish clothing, exhibitionism, voyeurism, foot fetishism, water sports, female dominance, bisexual exploration, transsexualism and sadomasochism, among others.

Home video 
In 1991, Penthouse Video had signed a deal with A*Vision Entertainment to release videos designed for an adult audience.

Casinos
In 1970, the Penthouse Club in London, England operated a casino.  However, the next year the casino license was revoked by the gaming authorities.  In 1972, Penthouse opened the Penthouse Adriatic Club casino on the island of Krk in Yugoslavia (now Croatia) at a cost of $45 million.  However, the casino filed for bankruptcy the following year and was closed. In 1978, Penthouse began construction of the Penthouse Boardwalk Hotel and Casino in Atlantic City, New Jersey.  However, Penthouse was unable to raise additional funding and construction stopped in 1980.  The project sat idle until Donald Trump acquired the site in 1993.

Auto racing

Penthouse sponsors the "1X" car of driver Randy Hannagan in the World of Outlaws sprint car series. The magazine previously sponsored cars in the Formula One circuit from the late 1970s to the early 1980s. Teams included Hesketh Racing and RAM Racing.

3D HD porn channel

January 2011, Penthouse announced the first 3D HD porn channel, which will be available in second quarter 2011. They shoot using dual lenses, and it will consist of available Penthouse HD Channel lineup covering over 30 platforms in more than 15 countries.

Wine and spirits
In January 2015, Penthouse announced its entry into the wine and spirits industry. The line of products were to debut at the 2015 Adult Entertainment Expo in Las Vegas. Called Libido Libations, the spirits line is distributed by Prestige Imports LLC and produced by The Melchers Group BV. The wine offerings are the result of a partnership with California vintner John Crossland and Randal Tomich of the Australian winery Tomich Wines.

Legal disputes

Editorial lawsuit
In March 1975, Penthouse published an article headlined "La Costa: The Hundred-Million-Dollar Resort with Criminal Clientele", written by Jeff Gerth and Lowell Bergman. The article indicated that the La Costa Resort and Spa in Carlsbad, California, was developed by Mervyn Adelson and Irwin Molasky using loans from the Teamsters Pension Fund and that the resort was a playground for organized crime figures. The owners, along with two officials of the resort, Morris B. Moe Dalitz and Allard Roen, filed a libel lawsuit for $522 million against the magazine and the writers. In 1982, a jury absolved the magazine of any liability against the lawsuit from the owners. The plaintiffs appealed, but in December 1985, before a new trial could begin, the two sides settled. Penthouse issued a statement that they did not mean to imply that Adelson and Molaskey are or were members of organized crime. In turn the plaintiffs issued a statement lauding Penthouse publisher Guccione and his magazine for their "personal and professional awards". Total litigation costs were estimated to exceed $20 million.

Guccione v. Penthouse Media Group
In 2006, Guccione sued Penthouse Media Group for fraud, breach of contract, and conspiracy, among other charges. Some of the people named in the case included Marc Bell, Jason Galanis,  Dr. Fernando Molina, Charles Samel, and Daniel C. Stanton.

National rampage protests
In December 1984, a group of radical feminists began a civil disobedience campaign against Penthouse which they called a National Rampage. Led by Melissa Farley and Nikki Craft, they went into stores selling copies of the magazine and ripped them up, and they also burned an effigy of Bob Guccione in front of a bookstore in Madison, Wisconsin. In late 1985 the group began to focus on the printer of Penthouse, Meredith Corporation. They bought shares in the company and attended their annual stockholder's meeting. The women were not allowed to speak, but they removed their coats, revealing images from a Penthouse shoot about Japanese rope bondage—among which two poses were construed by Farley to evoke dead bodies—ironed onto [their] shirts.

International versions
As of 2015:

 Australia edition
 Bulgarian edition (discontinued)
 Dutch edition
 German edition
 Greek edition
 Hong Kong edition (discontinued)
 Hungarian edition
 New Zealand edition
 Portuguese edition
 Russian Edition
 Spanish edition
 Thai edition
 United Kingdom edition
 United States edition

See also

 Hustler
 List of men's magazines
 List of Penthouse Pets
 Penthouse Comix
 Penthouse Forum
 Playboy
 Pubic Wars
 Oh, Wicked Wanda!

References

External links

 
Cover archive at Galactic Central

 
Monthly magazines published in the United Kingdom
Men's magazines published in the United Kingdom
Online magazines published in the United Kingdom
Defunct magazines published in the United Kingdom
Magazines established in 1965
Magazines disestablished in 2016
Companies that filed for Chapter 11 bankruptcy in 2003
Companies that filed for Chapter 11 bankruptcy in 2013
Companies that filed for Chapter 11 bankruptcy in 2018
Online magazines with defunct print editions
Obscenity controversies in literature
Pornographic men's magazines
Sexual revolution